John Till may refer to:

John Till, Canadian musician
John Christian Till, composer
John Farrell Till, editor

See also
John Till Allingham, dramatist